The Tecma Medil is a French high-wing, two-place, hang glider, designed and produced by Tecma Sports of Saint-Pierre-en-Faucigny, introduced in 1992. The aircraft is supplied complete and ready-to-fly.

Design and development
The Medil was designed for flight training and passenger flights and is made from aluminum tubing, with the single-surface wing covered in 4 oz Dacron sailcloth. Its  span wing is cable braced from a single kingpost.

The sole model, the Medil 21, is named for its rough wing area in square metres.

Specifications (Medil 21)

References

External links
Official website

Medil
Hang gliders